Arionellus Barrande, 1850, is a disused name for a genus of trilobite.  The name Arionellus was a replacement for Arionides Barrande, 1847, itself a replacement for Arion Barrande, 1846, which was preoccupied because Férussac had already used it in 1819 for a genus of slugs.

Agraulos had already been proposed as replacement for Arion by Hawle and Corda in 1847, but Barrande unjustly considered it a homonym of Agraulis, a butterfly named by Boisduval in 1836.

The species of Arionellus have now been reassigned to the following genera.
 A. bipunctatus = Croixana bipunctata
 A. ceticephalus = Agraulos ceticephalus
 A. convexus = Camaraspis convexa
 A. cylindricus = Keithiella cylindrica 
 A. oweni = Modocia oweni 
 A. primaevus = Strenuaeva primaeva
 A. pustulatus = Glaphurus pustulatus 
 A. texanus = Tricrepicephalus texanus
 A. tripunctatus = Tricrepicephalus tripunctatus

References 

Disused trilobite generic names
Taxa named by Joachim Barrande